Remond or Rémond is a surname of French origin. Notable people with the surname include:

Alain Rémond (born 1946), French humor columnist
Carol Remond, American journalist
Charles Lenox Remond (1810–1873), American orator, abolitionist, and military organizer
Jacques Rémond (born 1948), French former footballer
Cristina Rémond, Canadian beauty queen
Remond Willis (born 1985), Canadian football player
René Rémond (1918–2007), French historian and political economist
Sarah Parker Remond (1826–1894), American physician, lecturer, and abolitionist; sister of Charles